Audru is a small borough in Pärnu County, southwestern Estonia. It is the administrative centre of Audru Parish. At the 2011 Census, the settlement's population was 1,492.

Composer Aleksander Kunileid was born in Audra in 1845.

See also
Audru Ring

References

External links
Audru Parish 

Boroughs and small boroughs in Estonia
Kreis Pernau